Alfred Joseph Hyde (1884 – date of death unknown) was an English cricketer.  Hyde was a left-handed batsman who bowled slow left-arm orthodox.

Hyde made two first-class appearances for Warwickshire, the first against Northamptonshire at the County Ground, Northampton, in the 1905 County Championship, and the second against Lancashire at Edgbaston in the 1907 County Championship.  His first match against Northamptonshire saw the opposition winning the toss and electing to bat, with them being dismissed for 196 in that first-innings, with Hyde taking a single wicket, that of William Wells to finish with figures of 1/22 from seven overs.  In response, Warwickshire made 125 all out, with him ending the innings not out on 3.  He bowled just two overs in Northamptonshire's second-innings of 200 all out, going wicketless.  The match ended in a draw.  His second match against Lancashire saw the opposition win the toss and elect to bat, compiling 493/7 declared in that first-innings, with Hyde taking the wicket of the Les Poidevin to finish with figures of 1/87.  Warwickshire reached 179/6 in their first-innings response, before weather conspired to ensure the match ended in a draw, with Hyde not having to bat in that only innings.

References

External links
Alfred Hyde at ESPNcricinfo
Alfred Hyde at CricketArchive

1884 births
English cricketers
Warwickshire cricketers
Year of death missing